Hacıalılı (also, Gadzhally) is a village and municipality in the Qabala Rayon of Azerbaijan.  It has a population of 1,307.

References 

Populated places in Qabala District